Alfred García Castillo (born 14 March 1997) is a Spanish singer-songwriter. He gained national recognition when he took part in series nine of the reality television talent competition Operación Triunfo, where he finished in fourth place, and also represented Spain in the Eurovision Song Contest 2018 in Lisbon, Portugal, alongside Amaia Romero, with the song "Tu canción", finishing in twenty-third place.

Early life
García was born on 14 March 1997 in El Prat de Llobregat, Catalonia. He began formal training in vocals and trombone at the age of seven. García is also a self-taught guitarist, drummer, and keyboardist. He received musical training at the Unió Filharmònica del Prat. García is studying for a degree in audiovisual communication, as well as being in his third year of a higher degree in music and jazz and modern music studies at the Taller de Músics, a music school in Barcelona.

Career

2012–2016: Beginnings 
At the age of fifteen, García released the self-produced and self-published album Beginning. At the age of seventeen, thanks to the musical project La Capsa, he recorded his first single "She Looks So Beautiful", written by himself and produced by Argentine musician Esteban García. The single won the Audience Award at the Festival Cara B in Barcelona. García has also released a musical short film, A Free Christmas Story.

In 2016, García participated in season four of talent show La Voz, the Spanish version of The Voice. He performed John Mayer's "Waiting on the World to Change" in the Blind Auditions, but none of the coaches turned for him. Also in 2016, García released the self-produced and self-published acoustic album Inblack (Volume One).

2017–2018: Operación Triunfo and Eurovision 

In 2017, García auditioned for series nine of reality television music competition Operación Triunfo. On 23 October 2017, he was selected to enter the show's "Academy". On 29 January 2018, during the special live show "Gala Eurovisión" of Operación Triunfo, he was selected by public vote to represent Spain in the Eurovision Song Contest 2018 along with his then-girlfriend Amaia Romero, with the song "Tu canción". During the finale of Operación Triunfo 2017 on 5 February 2018, García finished in fourth place.

Amaia and Alfred were the second to perform at the Eurovision final, held on 12 May 2018 in Lisbon, Portugal. They placed twenty-third out of the 26 participating countries with 61 points: 43 from the professional juries and 18 from the televote.

2018–2019: 1016 

Two days after returning from the Eurovision Song Contest, García started to record 1016, his first studio album with a major record label, Universal Music Spain. The album was preceded by the 1016 Is Coming tour in festivals across Spain in Summer 2018. In addition, García performed at a special charity concert of Operación Triunfo 2017 at the Santiago Bernabéu Stadium in Madrid on 29 June 2018, and made special guest appearances at concerts by David Bisbal or Love of Lesbian, among others.

"De la Tierra hasta Marte", the first single from 1016, was released on 5 December 2018. The album was released on 14 December 2018 and debuted at number 2 on the Spanish Albums Chart. In support of his debut studio album, 1016, García embarked on the 1016 Tour, which began on 28 February 2019 and ended on 9 November 2019.

2021: 1997
After a year-long hiatus, on 15 January 2021, García released "Los Espabilados", which served both as the first single from his upcoming studio album and the theme song for the Movistar+ series Alive and Kicking. Follow-up singles "Praia dos Moinhos" y "Toro de Cristal" were also included in the studio album 1997, released on 29 October 2021. The album debuted at number 5 on the Spanish Albums Chart.

2022–2023: Benidorm Fest and Tu cara me suena 
In September 2022, García was announced as part of the cast of the tenth season of reality television series Tu cara me suena.

In October 2022, García was selected to participate in the second edition of Benidorm Fest, the song festival organised to determine 's entry for the Eurovision Song Contest, with the song "Desde que tú estás". He finished in fifth place in the second semi-final, one position short of advancing to the national final.

Discography

Albums
 Beginning (2012)
 Inblack (Volume One) (2016)
 1016 (2018)
 1997 (2021)

Awards and nominations

References

External links

YouTube channel

1997 births
Eurovision Song Contest entrants of 2018
Living people
People from El Prat de Llobregat
Eurovision Song Contest entrants for Spain
Spanish pop singers
English-language singers from Spain
Operación Triunfo contestants
Benidorm Fest contestants
21st-century Spanish singers
21st-century Spanish male singers